The Rhayader television relay station is sited on high ground to the northeast of the town of Rhayader, south Wales. It was originally built in the 1980s as a fill-in relay for UHF analogue television covering the communities of Rhayader and St. Harmon. It consists of a 45 m self-supporting lattice steel mast standing on a hillside which is itself about 345 m above sea level. The transmissions are beamed southwest and northwest to cover its targets. The Rhayader transmission station is owned and operated by Arqiva.

Rhayader transmitter re-radiates the signal received off-air from Llandrindod Wells which is itself an off-air relay of Carmel about 60 km to the southwest. When it came, the digital switchover process for Rhayader duplicated the timing at Carmel with the first stage taking place on 26 August 2009 and with the second stage being completed on 23 September 2009. After the switchover process, analogue channels had ceased broadcasting permanently and the Freeview digital TV services were radiated at an ERP of 20 W each.

Channels listed by frequency

Analogue television

1980s - 26 August 2009
Being in Wales, Rhayader transmitted the S4C variant of Channel 4.

Analogue and digital television

26 August 2009 - 23 September 2009
The UK's digital switchover commenced at Carmel (and therefore at Rhayader and all its other relays) on 26 August 2009. Analogue BBC Two Wales on channel 26 was first to close, and ITV Wales was moved from channel 23 to channel 26 for its last month of service. Channel 23 was replaced by the new digital BBC A mux which started up in 64-QAM and at full power (i.e. 20 W).

Digital television

23 September 2009 - present
The remaining analogue TV services were closed down and the digital multiplexes took over on the original analogue channels' frequencies.

References

External links
The Transmission Gallery: Rhayader

Transmitter sites in Wales
Carmel UHF 625-line Transmitter Group